

Lac de Lovenex is a lake in the municipality of St-Gingolph, Valais, Switzerland. It is located an elevation of 1632 m below Mont Gardy.

See also
List of mountain lakes of Switzerland

External links

Lovenex